Horst Kilian (born 29 January 1950) is a German water polo player. He competed in the men's tournament at the 1976 Summer Olympics.

References

1950 births
Living people
German male water polo players
Olympic water polo players of West Germany
Water polo players at the 1976 Summer Olympics
Sportspeople from Würzburg